Bolstadøyri is a village in Voss municipality, Vestland county, Norway. The village lies at the mouth of the river Bolstadelvi, where it meets the Bolstadfjorden.

The village has a railway station, Bolstadøyri Station, which is part of the Bergensbanen railway line and is also served by the Bergen Commuter Rail.  The European route E16 highway runs through the village also.

References

Villages in Vestland
Voss